Zieten (pre-reform spelling Ziethen) may refer to:

People
Hans Joachim von Zieten (1699–1786), Prussian general who served in the Silesian Wars
Hans Ernst Karl, Graf von Zieten (1770–1848), Prussian General in the Napoleonic Wars
Reiner Protsch von Zieten (born 1939), anthropologist usually known as Reiner Protsch.

Other
 Hussars Regiment of Zieten (Brandenburg) No. 3, an hussars regiment the Prussian/German Imperial Army
 SMS Zieten (ship, 1876) was the first torpedo-armed aviso built for the Imperial German Navy (Kaiserliche Marine).
 Zieten (horse)

See also
 Ziethen (disambiguation)